Estádio Municipal Bom Jesus da Lapa, also known as Toca do Dragão, is a football stadium located in Apucarana, Brazil.  The stadium has a maximum capacity of 13,000 people, and it is located in the Minas Gerais Avenue, s/n - Apucarana, Paraná. It was inaugurated in 1967, and it is owned by Apucarana City Hall.

History
Estádio Bom Jesus da Lapa was inaugurated on January 28, 1967. The stadium's attendance record currently stands at 15,000, set in 1989.

References

Bom Jesus